NA-100 Faisalabad-VI is a constituency for the National Assembly of Pakistan.

Members of Parliament

2018-2022: NA-106 Faisalabad-VI

Election 2002 

General elections were held on 10 Oct 2002. Nisar Ahmad of Pakistan Peoples Party Parliamentarian (PPPP) won by 58,855 votes.

Election 2008 

General elections were held on 18 Feb 2008. Saeed Iqbal of Pakistan Peoples Party Parliamentarian (PPPP) won by 65,322 votes.

Election 2013 

General elections were held on 11 May 2013. Nisar Ahmad of PML-N won by 122,041 votes and became the  member of National Assembly.

Election 2018 
General elections were held on 25 July 2018.

See also
NA-99 Faisalabad-V
NA-101 Faisalabad-VII

References

External links
 Election result's official website

NA-081